The Erg of Bilma is a dune sea (Arabic: erg) in the Ténéré desert region of the south central Sahara Desert. The Erg of Bilma stretches southwest from Fachi and the Tibesti Mountains. On the west it is bounded by the Aïr Mountains in north central Niger, and to the east it passes Bilma, continuing on to the Chadian border. It surrounds on three sides the oasis of Bilma, southernmost of a north–south string of oases of the Kaouar rise.

At its southernmost edge, some of the dunes have been stabilized by the growth of vegetation, allowing human cultivation of crops like millet and sorghum on the slopes.

History
The ancient Bornu Empire to Fezzan caravan routes had to cross the dunes of the erg south of Bilma as the last major obstacle before reaching the sahel.  While that traffic largely ceased after 1820, trade though the erg of Bilma continues from the Lake Chad region and the Termit Massif on a small scale.

See also
List of ergs

References

Further reading
.

External links

 Prof. Dr. R. Baumhauer at The University of Trier's Geography center has produced a number of papers on the Geography and Paleogeography of the Erg of Bilma.
 Surviving the Sahara : National Geographic, December 2002.

Bilma
Bilma
Sahara